Prenocephale (meaning "sloping head") is a genus of small pachycephalosaurid dinosaur from the Late Cretaceous Nemegt Formation of Mongolia. It was similar in many ways to its close relative, Homalocephale.

Description

Unlike the flattened wedge-shaped skull of Homalocephale (a possible juvenile trait also potentially seen in early growth stages of Pachycephalosaurus), the head of Prenocephale was rounded and sloping. The dome had a row of small bony spikes and bumps.

Like some other pachycephalosaurs, Prenocephale is known only from skulls and a few other small bones. For this reason, reconstructions usually depict Prenocephale as sharing the basic body plan common to all of the other Pachycephalosauria: a stout body with a short, thick neck, short forelimbs and tall hind legs.

The head of Prenocephale was comparable to that of Stegoceras, albeit with closed supratemporal fenestrae. Also, the paired grooves above the supraorbitals/prefrontals (along with a posterior parietal that restricts the frontal dome) are absent in Prenocephale. This differentiates the species from Stegoceras, as such features are common in the latter.

Classification

Prenocephale is a member of the Pachycephalosauria, a large clade of herbivorous/omnivorous dinosaurs from the Late Cretaceous. Robert Sullivan considered Foraminacephale, "Prenocephale" edmontonensis, and Sphaerotholus goodwini to form a clade with the Asian taxon P. prenes. He considered Tylocephale the sister taxon to the Prenocephale clade, while sinking Sphaerotholus buchholtzae as a subjective junior synonym of "P." edmontonensis. They all possess a distinct row of nodes on the squamosal and parietal areas of the skull roof. However, Longrich et al. (2010) and Schott and Evans (2016) kept Sphaerotholus as a distinct genus based on cladistic analysis.

Homalocephale has been viewed as a possible juvenile of Prenocephale due to the lack of a dome and its discovery in the same location and chronological interval, but new specimens of Prenocephale, including a juvenile specimen, suggest that Homalocephale, even if its holotype is a juvenile, is distinct.

Below is a cladogram modified from Evans et al., 2013.

Paleobiology

As with most of its relatives, scientists do not yet know what these dinosaurs ate. However the premaxillary teeth and muzzle are not as wideset as in its relative Stegoceras, indicating different feeding preferences, possibly that Prenocephale was a more selective forager. Some scientists suggest that it may have been an omnivore, eating both plants and insects. However, most experts agree that Prenocephale (and the other pachycephalosaurs) browsed on leaves and fruit.

Paleoenvironment
It lived in what is now the Nemegt Formation, in high upland forests, not the dry deserts of Mongolia today.

See also

 Timeline of pachycephalosaur research

References
 T. Maryanska and H. Osmolska. 1974. Pachycephalosauria, a new suborder of ornithischian dinosaurs. Palaeontologia Polonica 30:45-102.

External links

Pachycephalosaurs
Late Cretaceous dinosaurs of Asia
Maastrichtian life
Nemegt fauna
Fossil taxa described in 1974
Taxa named by Teresa Maryańska
Taxa named by Halszka Osmólska
Ornithischian genera